St. Chad's may refer to several things, many of which were named for St Chad of Mercia:

Places
St. Chad's, Newfoundland and Labrador, Canada

Religious institutions in England and Wales
St Chad's Chapel, Tushingham, Cheshire
St. Chad's Church (disambiguation)
St. Chad's Cathedral, Birmingham
Lichfield Cathedral, also known as the Cathedral Church of the Blessed Virgin Mary & St Chad

Educational institutions in England
St Chad's College of the University of Durham
St Chad's College Boat Club, the college boat club
St Chad's Catholic and Church of England Academy, Runcorn
St Chad's R.C Primary School, Manchester
St Chad's R.C Primary School (Sedgley), West Midlands

Other
Lichfield Gospels, also known as St Chad's gospels, a Gospel Book in Lichfield Cathedral